The Liberty Theater is a historic theater building in La Grande, Oregon, United States.

The theater was listed on the National Register of Historic Places in 1999.

See also
National Register of Historic Places listings in Union County, Oregon

References

External links

Liberty Theater at University of Oregon Libraries
Oregon Heritage Exchange blog post regarding restoration of the theater

1910 establishments in Oregon
Individually listed contributing properties to historic districts on the National Register in Oregon
La Grande, Oregon
National Register of Historic Places in Union County, Oregon
Theatres completed in 1910
Theatres in Oregon
Theatres on the National Register of Historic Places in Oregon